Tenrikyo Church Headquarters  (Tenrikyo Kyokai Honbu 天理教教会本部) is the main headquarters of the Tenrikyo religion, located in Tenri, Nara, Japan. This establishment is significant to followers because it is built around the Jiba, the spot where followers believe the god Tenri-O-no-Mikoto conceived humankind.

Organization

Hierarchy

The organization of Tenrikyo Church Headquarters consists primarily of the headquarters proper (本部 honbu), grand churches (大教会 daikyōkai), branch churches (分教会 bunkyōkai), and dioceses (教区 kyōku). Under the management of the main headquarters is a dual organizational structure, such that the grand churches and branch churches minister to adherents genealogically while the dioceses minister to adherents geographically.

At the top of the church hierarchy is the Shinbashira, who is defined as the "spiritual and administrative leader" of Tenrikyo Church Headquarters.

Many of the current grand churches were established by missionaries around the turn of the twentieth century, and typically the head ministers of the grand churches are hereditary or adoptive successors of those first missionaries. The head ministers of the grand churches are closely affiliated with the headquarters and supervise the daughter and granddaughter churches under their pastoral care, called branch churches. Therefore, the majority of branch churches belong to a grand church, and the two form the ecclesiastical equivalent of a parent-child relationship. However, a small group of branch churches happen to be directly affiliated with the headquarters for historical or administrative reasons.

The diocese is responsible for supervising the Tenrikyo churches in a given prefecture. The diocese administrator approves church maintenance, fiscal budgets, and the hiring and dismissal of church staff.

Doctrine

Liturgy and prayer

Sanctuaries

Main Sanctuary

The Main Sanctuary (神殿 Shinden) houses the Kanrodai, the stand that marks the Jiba where adherents believe God conceived humankind.

The earliest sanctuary was the Tsutome basho (Place for the Service), constructed by the carpenter Iburi Izo in 1864. In the Taishō period, a major construction project was undertaken, and as a result what is currently the north section of the Main Sanctuary was completed in December 1913. Another construction project took place during the Shōwa period, which led to the completion of the south section in 1934. The west and east sections were expanded from 1977 to 1984.

Foundress' Sanctuary

The Foundress' Sanctuary (教祖殿 Kyōsoden) is a building dedicated to the foundress of Tenrikyo, Nakayama Miki.

The first sanctuary was a temporary structure constructed in 1895. As part of a major construction effort during the Taishō period, the Foundress’ Sanctuary was completed in April 1914. This building is currently used as the Memorial Hall (see below). In the Shōwa period, another major construction took place, and as a result a larger Foundress' Hall was completed and dedicated on October 25, 1933.

Memorial Hall

The Memorial Hall (祖霊殿 Soreiden) is a memorial that honors deceased Tenrikyo adherents, located northwest of the Main Sanctuary and connected by a sanctuary corridor.

The earliest memorial dedicated to Tenrikyo followers was inside the Tsutome basho (Place for the Service), an early worship hall. As part of a major construction effort during the Taisho era, a memorial was built in the middle of the corridor connecting the Main Sanctuary and the Foundress' Sanctuary. The current Memorial Hall structure was also built during this time, though it was conceived originally as the Foundress' Sanctuary. In 1914, memorial services (mitamasai) began to be conducted in the spring and fall of each year. In 1933, the current structure for the Foundress’ Sanctuary was constructed, and the previous structure was renamed the Memorial Hall.

Inside the Memorial Hall, there are three altars. The middle altar honors deceased members of the Nakayama family, including the late Shinbashiras and their wives, as well as the early disciples Izo Iburi, Naraito Ueda, and Chushichi Yamanaka. The right altar honors deceased performers of the Service conducted at Tenrikyo Church Headquarters. The left altar honors deceased church ministers and followers.

History

Obtaining government recognition
Due to constant persecution from local government authorities and from members of established religions, the followers of Tenrikyo wanted to apply for legal authorization to establish a church. However, Japanese law during the Meiji period stipulated that legal authorization could only be granted if the church were classified under an established tradition, such as Shinto, Buddhism, or Christianity. Though Tenrikyo does not consider itself a Shinto tradition, early followers agreed to file under Shinto in order to obtain the protections from legal authorization. Several failed attempts were made; the first one was on April 29, 1885 to the governor of Osaka Prefecture.

Under Shinto Main Bureau
Tenrikyo Church Headquarters was established in 1888 as a religious organization belonging to the Shinto Main Bureau (神道本局 Shinto Honkyoku). The legal authorization removed the threat of suppression and allowed followers could seek permission to establish branch churches and to gain official recognition for missionary work. The membership rose sharply in the first decade of the Headquarters' existence. In 1892, the number of Tenrikyo followers had allegedly reached over one million, a thirty-fold increase in membership in five years. By December 1896, Tenrikyo had 3,137,113 members belonging to 1,078 churches, and there were 19,061 ministers. This growth invited negative reactions from Buddhist institutions, which were concerned about losing adherents, and from newspapers, who labeled the religion as "anti-social."

On April 6, 1896, the Home Ministry (内務省 Naimu-shō) issued "Directive No. 12," which ordered strict and secretive surveillance over Tenrikyo Church Headquarters under the pretense of maintaining and strengthening the state polity of Japan. Issues raised by authorities were the congregation of both men and women together, the obstruction of medical treatment and the alleged policy of enforced donations."

The Tenrikyo leaders complied to the state's demands in several ways. They changed several aspects of their prayer ritual, known to adherents as the "Service". The name of the Tenrikyo deity Tenri-O-no-Mikoto was changed to Tenri-no-Okami. Tenrikyo's doctrine was altered to conform with the official State Shinto doctrine. Tenrikyo Church Headquarters' conformity with the state demands resulted in a dual structure of the Tenrikyo faith, where on the surface, Tenrikyo complied with the state demands, while adherents disregarded those changes and maintained the teachings and rites as initially taught by Miki Nakayama.<ref>Tenrikyo: The Path to Joyousness, 61-63.</ref>

Drive toward sectarian independence
In 1899 the Shinto Main Bureau advised the Tenrikyo Church Headquarters officials about the possibility of official recognition as an independent religion (independent meaning to be classified directly under the Meiji government, which upheld State Shinto ideology). Tenrikyo leaders worked to systemize the Tenrikyo doctrine and institutionalize the organization so that the petition for independence would pass. Tenrikyo Church Headquarters made a total of five attempts before it finally achieved independence in 1908.

On April 1, 1900, Tenri Seminary, Tenrikyo's first educational institution, was founded as a training school for ministers. In 1902, Tenrikyo arranged its mission administration system in Japan, which divided the country into ten dioceses and appointed superintendents to supervise regional missionary activities.

In 1903, an edition of Tenrikyo's doctrine was compiled (known today as the Meiji kyoten, or the Meiji version of Tenrikyo's doctrine). This edition of the doctrine differs significantly from the present edition because the teachings of State Shinto were incorporated in order to gain the Home Ministry's approval. Although Tenrikyo Church Headquarters complied with many of the state's requests, it did not compromise on the request to completely eliminate the Mikagura-uta ("The Songs for the Service"), one of Tenrikyo's main scriptures.

Around this time, Tenrikyo began to open its first churches overseas in Taiwan (1897), Korea (1904), Manchuria (1911), the U.S. (1927), Brazil, and Southeast Asian countries.

Sect Shinto
The fifth petition for independence was submitted to the Home Ministry on March 20, 1908 and accepted later that year on November 27. Tenrikyo Church Headquarters set up its Administrative Headquarters, formally appointed Shinnosuke Nakayama as the first shinbashira, the spiritual and administrative leader of Tenrikyo, and established its constitution. On February 25, 1912, the Home Ministry invited representatives from seventy-three religious groups to the Three Religions Conference (三教会同 Sankyokaido) including a Tenrikyo representative (the three religions represented were Shinto, Buddhism, and Christianity, and Tenrikyo was categorized under Shinto). This conference initiated a program of national edification, and with the support of the government, Tenrikyo was able to hold lectures at 2,074 places through Japan, drawing nearly a quarter million listeners. Due to the relative relaxation of state control on Tenrikyo rituals, the performance of section one of the Mikagura-uta was restored in 1916, after two decades of prohibition under the Home Ministry's directive.

In 1925, a school of foreign languages was established for missionaries, including what would become Tenri Central Library. The same year saw the establishment of a printing office, a department for researching of doctrinal and biographical materials, and a major expansion of the church's education system, including a new girls’ school, nursery, kindergarten, and elementary school.

In 1928, the Ofudesaki was published. Three years later, in 1931, the publication of the Osashizu was completed, making the three main scriptures of Tenrikyo available to all followers for the first time.

On the occasion of the completion of the South Worship Hall of the Main Sanctuary in 1934, the Kagura Service was restored for the first time since it had been prohibited in 1896.

Wartime Japan
As the war between Japan and China grew from the Mukden Incident to the Second Sino-Japanese War, state control of religious and secular thought intensified. For example, in December 1935, state authorities destroyed the buildings of Omotokyo Headquarters and arrested the organization's leaders. One week later, on December 16, 1935, around four hundred policemen were sent to investigate Tenrikyo Church Headquarters on suspicion of tax evasion, even though there were no grounds for that accusation.

After the National Mobilization Law was passed in 1938, Japan's wartime polity strengthened. In 1939, Tenrikyo Church Headquarters announced that it would reform its doctrine and ritual, under threat of forced disbanding of the organization by state authorities. Under the reformation, copies of the Ofudesaki and Osashizu were recalled, certain chapters were deleted from the Mikagura-uta, and the Kagura Service, an important Tenrikyo ritual, was not allowed to be performed. All preaching, rites, and events were to follow the Meiji version of Tenrikyo's doctrine from 1903. The 1940 Religious Organizations Law further increased state surveillance and oppression in Japan.

After World War II
In its own historical account, Tenrikyo refers to the years following the surrender of Japan and the conclusion of World War II as fukugen, or "restoration." One of the significant aspects of the "restoration" was the republishing and reissuing of the three scriptures of Tenrikyo in their entirety: the Mikagura-uta in 1946, the Ofudesaki in 1948, and the Osashizu'' in 1949. In addition, the doctrine, which for decades had been colored by State Shinto ideology, was revised to reflect the teachings conveyed in the main scriptures and authorized in 1949.

Another aspect of the "restoration" was the construction of the Oyasato-yakata, begun in 1954. As of 1998, twenty four wings have been completed and are used for various purposes, such as educational facilities, medicinal facilities, institutes for doctrinal studies and religious training, and followers' dormitories. The construction continues to this day.

The "Tenrikyo-Christian Dialogue," a symposium cosponsored by Tenri University and Pontifical Gregorian University, was held in Rome, Italy from March 9–11, 1998. Three years later, the universities cosponsored another symposium, "Tenrikyo-Christian Dialogue II," held at Tenri, Japan from September 28–30, 2002.

References

Citations

Bibliography
 

Tenrikyo